Ville Valtteri Pekkola (born January 31, 1989, in Lahti) is a Finnish basketball player. 190 cm tall shooting guard/small forward Pekkola plays for Tampereen Pyrintö in Korisliiga. Alongside Finnish competitions, Pekkola has represented Pyrintö in Baltic Basketball League. He is known of his good defensive abilities.

Pekkola won Finnish championship with Tampereen Pyrintö in 2014 and with Namika Lahti in 2009. Moreover, he has achieved Finnish cup championship in 2013 and cup silver medal in 2012.

Trophies and awards

Finnish championship in 2009 and 2014
Finnish Cup in 2013
Finnish Cup runner-up in 2012
Baltic League: fourth in 2014
Super Mario Shanghai Cup 2019- Defending Title

Sources
Ville Pekkola Finnish Basketball Association
Ville Pekkola Eurobasket.com
 Ville Pekkola Baltic Basketball League

References

1989 births
Living people
Tampereen Pyrintö players
Finnish men's basketball players
Sportspeople from Lahti
Small forwards
Shooting guards